Orthotaenia is a genus of moths belonging to the subfamily Olethreutinae of the family Tortricidae.

Species
Orthotaenia secunda Falkovitsh, 1962
Orthotaenia undulana ([Denis & Schiffermüller], 1775)

See also
List of Tortricidae genera

References

External links
tortricidae.com

Tortricidae genera
Taxa named by James Francis Stephens
Olethreutinae